Copelatus hebeter is a species of diving beetle. It is part of the genus Copelatus in the subfamily Copelatinae of the family Dytiscidae. It was described by Félix Guignot in 1953.

References

hebeter
Beetles described in 1953